Thatto Heath is an area of St Helens, in Merseyside, England.

Location
The area is bordered by Eccleston, Rainhill, Ravenhead, Sutton and Windle.

Population
The population of the ward at the 2011 census was 12,280.

Politics
Thatto Heath is a ward of the Metropolitan Borough of St Helens.

The three elected councillors for Thatto Heath ward are Cllrs Nova Charlton, Robyn Hattersley and Richard McCaulley of the Labour Party.

Transport
The area is served by Thatto Heath railway station, on the City Line between Liverpool and Wigan.

Sport
Rugby League club Thatto Heath Crusaders currently compete in the National Conference League Division 1.

Notable people
 Samuel Cheetham
 Harold Fishwick
 Roy Haggerty
 Alex Murphy (rugby league)
 Johnny Vegas

References

St Helens, Merseyside
Towns and villages in the Metropolitan Borough of St Helens